Desulfovibrio acrylicus  is a bacterium from the genus of Desulfovibrio which has been isolated from marine sediments from the Wadden Sea.

References

Further reading

External links
Type strain of Desulfovibrio acrylicus at BacDive -  the Bacterial Diversity Metadatabase

Bacteria described in 1997

Desulfovibrio